Breno Lorran da Silva Talvares (born 6 March 1995), or simply Breno Lorran, is a Brazilian professional footballer who plays as a left back for Aparecidense.

Career statistics

References

External links
Breno at Portal Oficial do Grêmio

1995 births
Living people
Brazilian footballers
Brazilian expatriate footballers
Association football fullbacks
Grêmio Foot-Ball Porto Alegrense players
Vitória S.C. players
São Bernardo Futebol Clube players
Grêmio Esportivo Brasil players
Goiás Esporte Clube players
Figueirense FC players
Londrina Esporte Clube players
Clube Náutico Capibaribe players
Associação Atlética Aparecidense players
Campeonato Brasileiro Série A players
Campeonato Brasileiro Série B players
Expatriate footballers in Portugal
Footballers from São Paulo (state)